Otowa Yurikago Kai is a Japanese children's choir, established in 1933. It is so named from Otowa-cho, a place name in Bunkyō, Tokyo, where it was born, Yurikago, a Japanese word for cradle, and Kai, meaning an association or group.

It has played an important role in broadcasting and recording Japanese and overseas children's songs in Japan.  From 1943 to 1951, it also was NHK Tokyo Children's Choir, attached to the Tokyo Broadcasting Station (JOAK) of the NHK - Japan Broadcasting Corporation radio network. They are also well known for doing several theme songs for anime and tokusatsu shows, going by the name Columbia Yurikago Kai, so named because they had a deal with Nippon Columbia.

In 1990, it appeared in an independent concert at Carnegie Hall in New York City.

Notable members
Members with participation at Zecchino d’Oro:
Yumiko Ashikawa 芦川祐美子 (La pioggia, 1997, most notable member)
 Minori Nara 奈良実乃里 (Spunta la luna, 2000)
 Shiori Kitada 北田 栞 (Il mio amico samurai, 2005)
 Ryōma Kainuma 海沼 亮午 (La scimmia, la volpe e le scarpe, 2010)

See also
Children's choir
NHK Tokyo Children's Choir
Beijing Angelic Choir
Vienna Boys' Choir
Lullaby

External links
Official Site (in Japanese)
NHK Tokyo Children's Choir (in Japanese)

Music in Tokyo
Choirs of children
Japanese culture
Musical groups established in 1933
Nippon Columbia artists
Anime musical groups
1933 establishments in Japan